Lyudmila Issayeva (born 26 September 1989) is a Kazakhstani female volleyball player. 
She is a member of the Kazakhstan women's national volleyball team.
She was part of the Kazakhstani national team  at the 2014 FIVB Volleyball Women's World Championship in Italy, and the 2016 FIVB Volleyball World Grand Prix.

On the club level, she played for Almaty in 2014, and at the 2017 Asian Women's Club Volleyball Championship.

Clubs
 2014  Almaty

References

External links 
 FIVB profile
 Lyudmila Issayeva 16th Asian Games - Day 8: Beach Volleyball

1989 births
Living people
Kazakhstani women's volleyball players
Beach volleyball players at the 2010 Asian Games
21st-century Kazakhstani women